Parthenina interstincta is a rather widely distributed species of sea snail, a marine gastropod mollusk in the family Pyramidellidae, the pyrams and their allies.

Distribution
This marine species occurs in the following locations:
 Northern Atlantic Ocean off the west coasts of the continent Europe
 Belgian Exclusive Economic Zone
 Canary Islands
 Cape Verde archipelago
 European waters (ERMS scope)
 Greek Exclusive Economic Zone
 Irish Exclusive economic Zone
 Italy
 Madeira
 Mediterranean Sea
 Morocco 
 Portuguese Exclusive Economic Zone
 Spanish Exclusive Economic Zone
 Ukrainian Exclusive Economic Zone
 United Kingdom Exclusive Economic Zone
 Wimereux

References

 Peñas, A.; Rolán, E.; Swinnen, F. (2014). The superfamily Pyramidelloidea Gray, 1840 (Mollusca, Gastropoda, Heterobranchia) in West Africa, 11. Addenda 3. Iberus. 32(2): 105-206 page(s): 112

External links
 To Biodiversity Heritage Library (1 publication)
 To CLEMAM
 To Encyclopedia of Life
 To Marine Species Identification Portal

Pyramidellidae
Molluscs of the Atlantic Ocean
Molluscs of the Mediterranean Sea
Invertebrates of the North Sea
Gastropods described in 1797